DAFNE or DAΦNE (Double Annular Φ Factory for Nice Experiments), is an electron-positron collider at the INFN Frascati National Laboratory in Frascati, Italy. It consists of 2 accelerator rings, both approximately 100 meters in length. Since 1999 it has been colliding electrons and positrons at a center of mass energy of 1.02 GeV to create phi mesons (φ). 85% of these decay into kaons (K), whose physics is the subject of most of the experiments at DAFNE.

There have been five experiments at DAFNE:
 KLOE (K LOng Experiment), which has been studying CP violation in kaon decays and rare kaon decays since 2000. This is the largest of  DAFNE experiments. It has been continued by the KLOE-2 experiment.
 FINUDA (FIsica NUcleare a DAFNE), studies the spectra and nonmesonic decays of hypernuclei containing Lambda baryons (Λ). The hypernuclei are produced by negatively charged kaons striking a thin target.
 DEAR (DAFNE Exotic Atoms Research experiment), determines scattering lengths in atoms made from a kaon and a proton or deuteron.
 DAFNE Light Laboratory (DAΦNE-L) consists of 3 lines of synchrotron radiation emitted by DAFNE, a fourth is under construction.
  SIDDHARTA (SIlicon Drift Detectors for Hadronic Atom Research by Timing Application), aims to improve the precision measurements of X-ray transitions in kaon atoms studied at DEAR.

External links
 Homepage of the accelerator division of Frascati National Laboratory: public (Italian), technical

Particle physics facilities
Particle experiments
Research institutes in Italy
Particle accelerators